Anthony William Jones (born 13 November 1955) is an Australian television news and political journalist, radio and television presenter and writer.

Early life
Jones attended Newington College from 1970 to 1974 and the University of Sydney as a resident of St Paul's College, where he studied English and, later, anthropology from 1975 to 1977.

Career
Jones started working for the Australian Broadcasting Corporation (ABC) as a radio current affairs cadet working on the AM, PM and The World Today programs. In 1985, he joined the Four Corners program as a reporter. In 1986, he went to the Dateline program on SBS. He returned to the ABC in 1987, reporting for Four Corners.

In 1990, Jones went to London as the ABC's current affairs correspondent. He covered the collapse of the USSR in Eastern Europe, the Gulf War, the war in the former Yugoslavia, the fall of Kabul to the Mujahadin and the collapse of apartheid. He returned to Australia in 1993 as executive producer of the Foreign Correspondent program. From 1994 to 1996, he was the ABC's correspondent in Washington, D.C., before returning to Foreign Correspondent in 1997. He also covered the war crimes in Bosnia. In mid-1998 he returned to Four Corners.

Jones hosted ABC TV's Lateline news and current affairs program from 1999. From 2011, he hosted the show on Wednesday and Thursday nights and also hosted the ABC's Q&A political panel discussion show.

Jones is one of Australia's most well known journalists, winning awards including four of Australia's leading journalism awards, the Walkleys. Crikey awarded him "Outstanding Media Practitioner of the Year" in 2005 for "ferocious intelligence, polite calmness, [being a] dogged interrogator, deep political instincts, juggling the running agenda, [and having] a great sense of context." Crikey also put much of the success of Lateline to Jones, stating, "Lateline without Jones is a perfectly adequate late night news review; with Jones it is a world-class piece of television."

In 2006, Jones and Lateline embarked on a series of stories that provided the catalyst for the Northern Territory Intervention. He has highlighted these stories as being the ones he is most proud of.

On the Q&A program, Jones regularly hosted national figures from politics, culture and the arts to discuss issues on the national agenda and face questions from a selected audience. He hosted the major party leaders during the 2010 Australian federal election. In 2010 on the Q&A program with Jones as host, former Taliban supporter David Hicks submitted an antagonistic question to former Prime Minister John Howard. In the same program, Jones apologised to Howard after a man threw his shoes at him in protest against the Iraq War.

On 7 November 2019, the ABC announced that Hamish McDonald would be joining the ABC as a senior presenter, replacing Jones at Q&A from 2020 while also presenting ABC Radio National's Breakfast and doing current affairs stories for Foreign Correspondent. Jones hosted his last episode of Q&A on 9 December 2019.

In 2019, Jones joined his wife, Sarah Ferguson, on the production of the ABC documentary series Revelation to write all three episodes.

Personal life
Jones is married to fellow ABC journalist Sarah Ferguson. They met in Paris when Jones engaged Ferguson as a researcher while he was the ABC's UK correspondent. They married in 1993 and have two children. Jones has another child from a previous relationship.

Awards
1987 Walkley Award for Best Television Current Affairs Report for his story Horses for Courses, which was broadcast on the ABC.
1991 Walkley Award for Best Coverage of a Current Story (Television), joint winner with Kerry O'Brien and Dugald Maudsley.
2004 Walkley Award for Broadcast Interviewing, for his interviews on Lateline.
2007 Walkley Award for Broadcast Interviewing, for his interviews on Lateline.
2020 Walkley Documentary Award, shared with Sarah Ferguson and Nial Fulton, for Revelation.

References

External links
 Lateline official website

ABC News (Australia) presenters
Australian television journalists
Walkley Award winners
Living people
People educated at Newington College
Place of birth missing (living people)
University of Sydney alumni
1955 births